The Dominican War of Independence made the Dominican Republic a sovereign state on February 27, 1844. Before the war, the island of Hispaniola had been united for 22 years when the newly independent nation, previously known as the Captaincy General of Santo Domingo, was unified with the Republic of Haiti in 1822. The criollo class within the country overthrew the Spanish crown in 1821 before unifying with Haiti a year later.

After the struggles that were made by Dominican patriots to free the country from Haitian control, they had to withstand and fight against a series of incursions that served to consolidate their independence (1844–56). Haitian soldiers would make incessant attacks to try to gain back control of the nation, but these efforts were to no avail, as the Dominicans would go on to win every battle.

Background
In the late 18th century, the island of Hispaniola had been divided into two European colonies: Saint-Domingue in the west, governed by France; and Santo Domingo in the east, governed by Spain, occupying two-thirds of Hispaniola. By the 1790s, large-scale slave rebellions erupted in the western portion of the island, which led to the eventual removal of the French and the independence of Haiti in 1804. Following the independence of Haiti, massive portions of the remaining French population were murdered. The eastern portion of the island was preparing itself for an eventual separation from Spain.

At the beginning of the 1800s, the colony of Santo Domingo, which had once been the headquarters of Spanish power in the New World centuries prior, was suffering an economic decline. Spain during this time was embroiled in the Peninsular War in Europe, and other various wars to maintain control of the Americas. With Spain's resources spread among its larger colonies, its Caribbean territories became relatively neglected. This period is referred to as the España Boba era.

The Captaincy General of Santo Domingo had approximately 80,000 inhabitants, with the majority being European descendants and mulattos. For most of its history Santo Domingo was used as a military base for the further expansion into the Americas and had an economy based on mining and cattle ranching. The population in the Spanish colony was significantly lower than the French side of the island, which had a population of nearly one million slaves before the Haitian Revolution.

First independence movement  

Santo Domingo was regionally divided with many rival and competing provincial leaders. During this period in time the Spanish crown wielded little to no influence in the colony. Some wealthy cattle ranchers had become rulers, and sought to bring control and order in the southeast of the colony where the "law of machete" ruled the land. On November 9, 1821 the former Captain general in charge of the colony, José Núñez de Cáceres, influenced by all the Revolutions that were going on around him, finally decided to overthrow the Spanish government and declared independence from Spanish rule, this would usher in an Ephemeral Independence.

Unification of Hispaniola (1822–1844)

A group of Dominican politicians and military officers in the frontier region had expressed interest in uniting the entire island, while they sought for power with the military support from Haitian officials against their enemies.

Haiti's president, Jean-Pierre Boyer, a mulatto who was seen as an ally promised his full support to the frontier governors, and thus he ceremoniously entered the country with around 10,000 soldiers in February 1822, after most of the cities and towns proclaimed their allegiance to Boyer between November 1821 and January 1822. On February 9, 1822, Boyer formally entered the capital city, Santo Domingo, where he was received by Núñez who offered to him the keys of the Palace. Boyer rejected the offer, while saying: "I have not come into this city as a conqueror but by the will of its inhabitants". The island was thus united from "Cape Tiburon to Cape Samana in possession of one government." 

Eventually, the Haitian government became extremely unpopular throughout the country. The Dominican population grew increasingly impatient with Haiti's poor management and perceived incompetence, and the heavy taxation that was imposed on their side. The country was hit with a severe economic crisis after having been forced to pay a huge indemnity to France. A debt was accrued by Haiti in order to pay for their own independence from the European nation; this would give rise to many anti-Haitian plots.

Resistance

In 1838, Juan Pablo Duarte, an educated nationalist, founded a resistance movement called La Trinitaria ("The Trinity") along with Ramón Matías Mella and Francisco del Rosario Sánchez. It was so named because its original nine members had organized themselves into cells of three. The cells went on to recruit as separate organizations, maintaining strict secrecy, with little or no direct contact among themselves, in order to minimize the possibility of detection by the Haitian authorities. Many recruits quickly came to the group, but it was discovered and forced to change its name to La Filantrópica ("The Philanthropic"). The Trinitarios won the loyalty of two Dominican-manned Haitian regiments.

In 1843, the revolution made a breakthrough: they worked with a liberal Haitian party that overthrew President Jean-Pierre Boyer. However, the Trinitarios' work in the overthrow gained the attention of Boyer's replacement, Charles Rivière-Hérard. Rivière-Hérard imprisoned some Trinitarios and forced Duarte to leave the island. While gone, Duarte searched for support in Colombia and Venezuela, but was unsuccessful. Upon returning to Haiti, Hérard, a mulatto, faced a rebellion by blacks in Port-au-Prince. The two regiments of Dominicans were among those used by Hérard to suppress the uprising.

In December 1843, the rebels told Duarte to return since they had to act quickly because they were afraid the Haitians had learned of their insurrection plans. When Duarte had not returned by February, because of illness, the rebels decided to take action anyway with the leadership of Francisco del Rosario Sánchez, Ramón Matías Mella, and Pedro Santana, a wealthy cattle-rancher from El Seibo who commanded a private army of peons who worked on his estates.

On February 27, 1844, some 100 Dominicans seized the fortress of Puerta del Conde in the city of Santo Domingo, and the following day the Haitian garrison surrendered. As these Haitian troops withdrew to the west side of the island, they pillaged and burned. In retaliation, Dominican gunboats bombarded Haitian ports.

Mella headed the provisional governing junta of the new Dominican Republic. On March 14, Duarte finally returned after recovering from his illness and was greeted in celebration.

The population of the new republic stood at approximately 174,000—5,000 whites, 135,000 mulattoes, and 34,000 blacks.

War of Independence

Haitian Commander, Charles Rivière-Hérard, sent three columns totaling 30,000 men to try and stop the Dominican uprising. The Battle of Fuente del Rodeo was the first major armed encounter against Haiti in the war. It was fought on March 13, 1844, in the southwest province of Bahoruco. A force of Dominican troops, a portion of the Army of the South, led by General Fernando Taveras, defeated an outnumbering force of the Haitian Army led by Hérard. The Dominicans fought with stones, knives, machetes, lances, clubs, and rifles. The Battle of Cabeza de Las Marías was fought between March 13 and March 18, 1844, in the southwest region near Azua de Compostela, Azua Province. Dominican troops led by General Manuel de Regla Mota, forced 10,000 troops of the Haitian Army to flee to Azua. 

The Battle of Azua was fought on March 19, 1844. A force of some 2,200 Dominican troops led by General Pedro Santana defeated an outnumbering force of 10,000 troops of the Haitian Army led by General Souffrant. After this victory, the Dominicans withdrew their headquarters to the Ocoa River, and the valleys of Baní, where their cavalry and lancers could operate; and in this way, they restrained the march of the Haitians, who could not advance beyond Azua; and having then attempted to open a way through the passes of the Manuel, they were in every re-encounter driven back with loss. Meanwhile, in the northern region, the Battle of Santiago was fought on March 30, 1844, at Santiago de los Caballeros, Santiago Province. Although heavily outnumbered, the Dominican troops, led by General José María Imbert, defeated Haitian Army troops led by General Jean-Louis Pierrot.

At sea, the Dominican schooners Maria Chica (3 guns), commanded by Juan Bautista Maggiolo, and the Separación Dominicana (5 guns), commanded by Juan Bautista Cambiaso, defeated a Haitian brigantine Pandora (unk. guns) plus schooners Le signifie (unk. guns) and La Mouche (unk. guns) off Tortuguero on April 15.

On June 17, 1845, the Dominicans, under the command of General Antonio Duvergé, invaded Haiti in retaliation for Haitian border raids. The invaders captured two towns on the Plateau du Centre and established a bastion at Cachimán. Haitian President Jean-Louis Pierrot quickly mobilized his army and counterattacked on July 22, driving the invaders from Cachimán and back across the frontier. On August 6, Pierrot ordered his army to invade the Dominican Republic. A member of La Trinitaria, José María Serra, claimed that over 3,000 Haitian soldiers and less than 20 Dominican militias had been killed at this point.

On September 17, 1845, the Dominicans defeated the Haitian vanguard near the frontier at Estrellita where the Dominican "square" repulsed, with the use of bayonets, a Haitian cavalry charge. On September 27, 1845, Dominican Gen. Francisco Antonio Salcedo defeated a Haitian army at the battle of "Beler," a frontier fortification. Salcedo was supported by Adm. Juan Bautista Cambiaso's squadron of three schooners, which blockaded the Haitian port of Cap-Haïtien. Among the dead were three Haitian generals. On October 28, other Haitian armies attacked the frontier fort "El Invencible" and were repulsed after five hours of hard fighting. In a significant naval action between the Hispaniolan rivals, a Dominican squadron captured 3 small Haitian warships and 149 seamen off Puerto Plata on December 21.

On March 9, 1849, President Faustin Soulouque of Haiti led 18,000 troops in an invasion of the Dominican Republic. Dominican General (and presidential contender) Santana raised 400 soldiers and, with the help of several gunboats, routed the Haitian invaders at the Battle of Las Carreras on April 21–22. The battle opened with a cannon barrage and devolved into hand-to-hand combat. Three Haitian generals were killed. As the remnants of the Haitian army retreated along the southern coastal road, they were under fire from a small Dominican squadron. Haitian strategy was ridiculed by the American press:

In November 1849, a small naval campaign was undertaken in which Dominican government schooners captured Anse-à-Pitres and one or two other villages on the southern coast of Haiti, which were sacked and burned by the Dominicans. The Dominicans also captured Dame-Marie, which they plundered and set on fire. In 1851, a truce was mediated by the United Kingdom, France, and the United States.

By late 1854, the Hispaniolan nations were at war again. In November, 2 Dominican ships captured a Haitian warship and bombarded two Haitian ports. In November 1855, Soulouque, having proclaimed himself Emperor Faustin I of a Haitian empire which he hoped to expand to include the Dominican Republic, invaded his neighbor again, this time with an army of 30,000 men marching in three columns. But again the Dominicans proved to be superior soldiers, defeating Soulouque's army, which vastly outnumbered them.

When Soulouque rode into Port-au-Prince with what remained of his army he was loudly cursed by women who had lost their sons, brothers, and husbands in the war. Nevertheless, he succeeded in securing for Haiti possession of Lascahobas and Hinche.

Battles
Battle of Fuente del Rodeo (March 13, 1844)
Battle of Cabeza de Las Marías (March 18, 1844)
Battle of Azua (March 19, 1844)
Battle of Santiago (March 30, 1844)
Battle of El Memiso (April 13, 1844)
Battle of Tortuguero (April 15, 1844)
Battle of Estrelleta (September 17, 1845)
Battle of Beler (November 27, 1845)
Battle of El Número (April 19, 1849)
Battle of Las Carreras (April 21, 1849)
Battle of Santomé (December 22, 1855)
Battle of Sabana Larga (January 24, 1856)

See also 

Dominican Restoration War
Six Years' War
Spanish American wars of independence

Notes

References
 
 
 
 
 
 
 
 
 

Spanish American wars of independence
History of the Dominican Republic
First Dominican Republic
Dominican Republic–Haiti relations
Conflicts in 1844
Conflicts in 1845
Conflicts in 1849
Conflicts in 1855
19th-century revolutions
Latin American wars of independence
19th century in the Dominican Republic
19th century in the Caribbean
Military history of the Caribbean
Wars involving the Dominican Republic
Wars involving Haiti